The Audiovisual Media Authority (AMA) is a statutory authority of the Albanian Government responsible for licensing and regulating the broadcasting and telecommunications industries in Albania. The organisation is authorised to investigate complaints made regarding programmes, issue warnings and fines, or even suspend the license of the radio or television station. The AMA was formed in July 2007.

Structure 
The AMA is run by 7 members (including the chairman and vice-chairman ) appointed by the Albanian Parliament for a period of 5 years, with the right of renewal only once. Among the 7 members of the AMA's, only the chairman and vice-chairman are full-time engaged in the day-to-day work activity of AMA.

Current Members:

Gentian Sala - Chairman
Sami Nezaj - Deputy Chairman
Agron Gjekmarkaj - Member
Gledis Gjipali - Member
Piro Misha - Member
Suela Musta - Member
Zylyftar Bregu - Member

References

Government agencies of Albania
Mass media agencies of Albania
Regulation in Albania